Viñuales is a Spanish surname. It may refer to

 Agustín Viñuales (1881–1959), Spanish lawyer, economist and politician who was briefly Minister of Finance in 1933
 Jorge E. Viñuales (born 1976), Professor of Law and Environmental Policy at the University of Cambridge